Luis García Meza Tejada (8 August 1929 – 29 April 2018) was a Bolivian general who served as the de facto 57th president of Bolivia from 1980 to 1981. He was a dictator convicted of human rights violations and leader of a violent coup. A native of La Paz, he was a career military officer who rose to the rank of general during the dictatorship of Hugo Banzer (1971–78).

Prelude to dictatorship
García Meza graduated from the military academy in 1952, and served as its commander from 1963 to 1964. He then rose to division commander in the late 1970s.

He became leader of the right-wing faction of the military of Bolivia most disenchanted with the return to civilian rule. Many of the officers involved had been part of the Hugo Banzer dictatorship and disliked the investigation of economic and human right abuses by the new Bolivian congress. Moreover, they tended to regard the decline in popularity of the Carter administration in the United States as an indicator that soon a Republican administration would replace it—one more amenable to the kind of pro-US, more hardline anti-communist dictatorship they wanted to reinstall in Bolivia. Many allegedly had ties to cocaine traffickers and made sure portions of the military acted as their enforcers/protectors in exchange for extensive bribes, which in turn were used to fund the upcoming coup. In this manner, the narcotraffickers were in essence purchasing for themselves the upcoming Bolivian government.

Coup d'état

This group pressured President Lidia Gueiler (his cousin) to install General García Meza as Commander of the Army. Within months, the Junta of Commanders headed by García Meza forced a violent coup d'état, sometimes referred to as the Cocaine Coup, of 17 July 1980, when several Bolivian intellectuals such as Marcelo Quiroga Santa Cruz were killed.  When portions of the citizenry resisted, as they had done in the failed putsch of November 1979, it resulted in dozens of deaths. Many were tortured. Allegedly, the Argentine Army unit Batallón de Inteligencia 601 participated in the coup.

Dictatorship, 1980-81
Of rightwing ultra-conservative anti-communist persuasion, García Meza endeavored to bring a Pinochet-style dictatorship that was intended to last 20 years. He immediately outlawed all political parties, exiled opposition leaders, repressed trade unions and muzzled the press. He was backed by former SS officer and Nazi German war criminal Klaus Barbie and Italian neofascist Stefano Delle Chiaie. Further collaboration came from other European neofascists, most notoriously Spanish Ernesto Milá Rodríguez (accused of the 1980 Paris synagogue bombing). Among other foreign collaborators were professional torturers allegedly imported from the notoriously repressive Argentine dictatorship of General Jorge Videla.

The García Meza regime, while brief (its original form ended in 1981), became internationally known for its extreme brutality. The population was repressed in the same ways as under the Banzer dictatorship. In January 1981, the Council on Hemispheric Affairs named the García Meza regime, "Latin America's most errant violator of human rights after Guatemala and El Salvador." Some 1,000 people are estimated to have been killed by the Bolivian Army and security forces in only 13 months. The administration's chief repressor was the Minister of Interior, Colonel Luis Arce, who cautioned that all Bolivians who opposed the new order should "walk around with their written will under their arms."

The most prominent victim of the dictatorship was the congressman, presidential candidate, and gifted orator Marcelo Quiroga, murdered and "disappeared" soon after the coup. Quiroga had been the chief advocate of bringing to trial the former dictator, General Hugo Banzer (who was in power from 1971 until 1978), for human right violations and economic mismanagement.

Drug trafficking
The García Meza government's drug trafficking activities led to the complete isolation of the regime. In contrast to his position regarding the other military dictatorships in Latin America, the new conservative U.S. President Ronald Reagan kept his distance, as the regime's unsavory links to criminal circles became more public. Eventually, the international outcry was sufficiently strong to force García Meza's resignation on 3 August 1981. He was succeeded by a less tainted but equally repressive general, Celso Torrelio.

The Bolivian military would sustain itself in power only for another year, and would then retreat to its barracks, embarrassed and tarnished by the excesses of the 1980–82 dictatorships (it has never returned to the Palacio Quemado).

Exile and jail
García Meza left the country but was tried and convicted in absentia for the serious human rights violations committed by his regime. In 1995, he was extradited to Bolivia from Brazil and was given a 30-year prison sentence, in the same penitentiary where he once kept his enemies. His main collaborator, Colonel Arce, was extradited to the United States, where he served a prison sentence for drug trafficking.

García Meza had reportedly been living in considerable comfort whilst in prison, with a barbecue, a gym, and a telephone at his disposal, not to mention a sauna and the occupation of three cells. These privileges were later revoked in response to protests from human rights organisations and victims.

Death
García Meza died in La Paz on April 29, 2018, of a heart attack at the age of 88.

See also
 Cabinet of Luis García Meza
 Roberto Suárez Goméz

References

Bibliography
Mesa José de; Gisbert, Teresa; and Carlos D. Mesa, "Historia De Bolivia," 5th edition,  pp. 681–689.
Prado Salmón, Gral. Gary. "Poder y Fuerzas Armadas, 1949-1982."

1929 births
2018 deaths
20th-century Bolivian politicians
Bolivian anti-communists
Bolivian generals
Bolivian people who died in prison custody
Bolivian prisoners and detainees
Drugs in Bolivia
Heads of government who were later imprisoned
Leaders who took power by coup
Military College of the Army alumni
People convicted of drug offenses
People extradited from Brazil
People extradited to Bolivia
People from La Paz
Presidents of Bolivia
Prisoners who died in Bolivian detention
Bolivian exiles